Conasprella ione, common name the ione cone, is a species of sea snail, a marine gastropod mollusk in the family Conidae, the cone snails and their allies.

Like all species within the genus Conasprella, these cone snails are predatory and venomous. They are capable of "stinging" humans, therefore live ones should be handled carefully or not at all.

Description
The size of the shell varies between 40 mm and 76 mm.

Distribution
This marine species occurs off Mozambique, Réunion, the Loyalty Islands, the Philippines, in the South China Sea; off Taiwan, Japan, New Caledonia and Western Australia.

References

 Fulton, H.C. 1938. Descriptions and figures of new Japanese marine shells. Proceedings of the Malacological Society of London 23(1): 55–56, pl. 3
 Wilson, B. 1994. Australian Marine Shells. Prosobranch Gastropods. Kallaroo, WA : Odyssey Publishing Vol. 2 370 pp. 
 Röckel, D., Korn, W. & Kohn, A.J. 1995. Manual of the Living Conidae. Volume 1: Indo-Pacific Region. Wiesbaden : Hemmen 517 pp.
 Puillandre N., Duda T.F., Meyer C., Olivera B.M. & Bouchet P. (2015). One, four or 100 genera? A new classification of the cone snails. Journal of Molluscan Studies. 81: 1–23

External links
 The Conus Biodiversity website
 Cone Shells – Knights of the Sea
 
 Specimen in MNHN, Paris

ione
Gastropods described in 1938